Kevin Rahm (born January 7, 1971) is an American actor known for his television roles as Kyle McCarty on Judging Amy, Lee McDermott on Desperate Housewives, and Ted Chaough on Mad Men.

Early life and education
Rahm attended and graduated from Atlanta High School in Atlanta, Texas in May 1989. Following high school, Rahm, then a member of the Church of Jesus Christ of Latter-day Saints, attended one the church's Missionary Training Centers before serving as a missionary in France, Switzerland, and on the islands of Mauritius and Réunion between 1990 and 1992. 

After returning to the United States, he studied pre-law at Brigham Young University, before changing his major to drama. In 1994, he was awarded the sought-after Irene Ryan Award for best college actor. In 1996, Rahm dropped out of college to pursue an acting career in Hollywood.

Career
Rahm played Kyle McCarty, Amy Gray's cousin, for 3 seasons on Judging Amy. He joined the show in season 3, when Dan Futterman left the show. He also played Norvo Tigan, the brother of Nicole de Boer's character of Ezri Dax, in the Star Trek: Deep Space Nine episode, "Prodigal Daughter"; "psychic-guy" patient Mr. Duff in the Grey's Anatomy episode, "Save Me". He also appeared in Scrubs as a patient. In 2001 he starred in the Volkswagen Super Bowl commercial "Big Day".

In September 2006, Rahm guest-starred in the two-part 7th season premiere of CSI: Crime Scene Investigation. On October 21, 2007, he made his first appearance as Lee McDermott, a new Wisteria Lane resident on ABC's Desperate Housewives, who is gay and has a husband, Bob Hunter (played by Tuc Watkins). 

Rahm guest-starred on Friends as Tim, Monica's inexperienced sous-chef, in "The One with Rachel's Date" in Season 8; played car salesman Brad Elias on the CBS', The Mentalist; and played Jack, Annie's ex-brother-in-law and crush, on Fox's I Hate My Teenage Daughter. In 2014, Rahm was cast as a newsroom editor in the film, Nightcrawler.
From 2010 to 2015, Rahm played Ted Chaough, a Madison Avenue advertising creative director, in AMC's award-winning show, Mad Men.

In March 2015, Rahm began a recurring role playing consultant and attorney, Michael Barnow, on the TV show, Madam Secretary.

Personal life
Rahm married Amy Lonkar, a cardio-thoracic surgeon, at the UC Davis Medical Center, on April 28, 2012. They have a daughter. The family currently lives in Sacramento, California.

Filmography

Film

Television

References

External links
 

1971 births
Living people
American male film actors
American male television actors
American Mormon missionaries in France
Mormon missionaries in Mauritius
Mormon missionaries in Réunion
American Mormon missionaries in Switzerland
Brigham Young University alumni
People from Bossier City, Louisiana
Actors from Shreveport, Louisiana
People from Mineral Wells, Texas
Male actors from Louisiana
Male actors from Texas
20th-century Mormon missionaries
American expatriates in Mauritius
Former Latter Day Saints
21st-century American male actors
20th-century American male actors